R. (on the application of Amicus) v Secretary of State for Trade and Industry [2004] EWHC 860 (Admin) is a UK labour law case, where a number of trade unions challenged the government's new implementation of EU Directive 2000/78/EC in the Employment Equality (Sexual Orientation) Regulations 2003

Facts
Various unions, including Amicus, challenged the government's implementation of sexuality discrimination law. In particular it was asked whether the exceptions created for churches and religious groups, being allowed to exclude gay people from employment was legitimate (r.7(3)).

Judgment
Richards J held that the implementation was adequate, though it was stressed that the exceptions would be tightly construed.
First, the genuine occupational requirements could apply where the employers were not satisfied an applicant met its requirements, as well as where they did not in fact. Second, it was rejected that a church group under r 7(3) could dismiss a gay cleaner, dismiss a science teacher for being a lesbian or not employ a gay person at a bookshop with holy scripts, even though people may have strong convictions. Nor could a Muslim group refuse a librarian post to someone appearing to be gay. It was ‘clear from the Parliamentary material that the exception was intended to be very narrow; and… is on its proper construction, very narrow.’ That so, because it is a derogation from the equal treatment principle. Third, there is a difference between a religious organisation, such as a faith school where there can be no discrimination, and ‘for the purposes of an organised religion’ where there can. Fourth, ‘so as to comply with the doctrines of the religion’ would be an objective rather than a subjective test under r 7(3)(b)(ii).

See also

UK employment discrimination law
UK labour law

Notes

United Kingdom labour case law
Anti-discrimination law in the United Kingdom
High Court of Justice cases
United Kingdom trade union case law
2004 in case law
2004 in British law
2004 in LGBT history
United Kingdom LGBT rights case law